Niall Campbell (born 1984),  is a Scottish poet. He has published two poetry collections and a poetry pamphlet.
He was a recipient of the Eric Gregory Award in 2011, winner of the Edwin Morgan Poetry Award in 2014, and was recipient of the Saltire First Book of the Year award.

Biography
Campbell was born in 1984 in South Uist in the Outer Hebrides of Scotland. He studied English literature at the University of Glasgow, where he began writing poetry. 
 He later completed a MLitt in  creative writing at the University of St. Andrews in 2009. Campbell currently lives in Leeds.

In 2011, Campbell was the recipient of an Eric Gregory Award and Robert Louis Stevenson Fellowship.  
In 2013, he  won the Poetry London Competition with his poem, The Letter Always Arrives at its Destination.
He also was the recipient of a Jerwood/Arvon mentorship in 2013. In 2012, Campbell's poetry pamphlet, After the Creel Fleet was published by HappenStance Press.

Campbell's first poetry collection, Moontide was published by Bloodaxe Books in 2014. The collection won the 2014 Edwin Morgan Poetry award
and was recipient of the Saltire First Book of the Year award. The collection was also shortlisted for the Fenton Aldeburgh First Collection Prize, the Saltire First Book of the Year Award, and the Forward Prize for Best First Collection.

Campbell's second poetry collection, First Nights, was published in the United States in 2017, as part of the Princeton Series of Contemporary Poets. The collection includes the poems in Moontide, along with sixteen new poems. In 2019, Bloodaxe Books published Noctuary, Campell's latest poetry collection.

Selected publications
 Moontide, (Bloodaxe Books, 2011), poetry collection
 After the Creel Fleet , poetry pamphlet
 First Nights: Poems (Princeton Series of Contemporary Poets)", (Princeton University Press, 2017), poetry collection
 Noctuary, Bloodaxe Books, 2019, poetry collection

Awards and recognition
 Eric Gregory Award, (2011)
 Robert Louis Stevenson Fellowship, (2011) 
 Edwin Morgan Poetry Prize, (2014)
 Saltire Society First Book of the Year Award, Moontide, (2014)
 Shortlisted for the Forward Poetry Prize for best first collection of poetry, (2014)
 Shortlisted for the Aldeburgh Prize for the best first collection of poetry, (2014)

References

People from Uist
Scottish male poets
Living people
Alumni of the University of Glasgow
Alumni of the University of St Andrews
1984 births